Adrián Martín may refer to:
Adrián Martín (footballer) (born 1982), Spanish footballer
Adrián Martín (motorcyclist) (born 1992), Spanish motorcyclist

See also
 Adrian Martin (born 1959), Australian film and arts critic